Domon is a surname. Notable people with the surname include:

 Alice Domon (1937–1977), French, Roman Catholic nun
 Eduard Domon, former IBM researcher
Domon group, interdisciplinary research group founded by Eduard Domon
 Jean-Siméon Domon (1774–1830), French general
 Ken Domon (1909 - 1990), Japanese photographer

Fictional characters
 Domon Kasshu, main character from the fictional anime and manga series G Gundam
 Bayle Domon, character in American author Robert Jordan's Wheel of Time series
 Naoki Domon (a.k.a. BlueRacer), one of the main heroes in Gekisou Sentai Carranger
 Asuka Domon, a character from Inazuma Eleven

Japanese-language surnames